Hongzhi Zhengjue, also sometimes called Tiantong Zhengjue (1091–1157), was an influential Chinese Chan Buddhist monk who authored or compiled several influential texts. Hongzhi's conception of silent illumination is of particular importance to the Chinese Caodong Chan and Japanese Sōtō Zen schools. Hongzhi was also the author of the Book of Equanimity, an important collection of kōans.

Life
According to the account given in Taigen Dan Leighton's Cultivating the Empty Field, Hongzhi was born to a family named Li in Xizhou, present-day Shanxi province. He left home at the age of eleven to become a monk, studying under Caodong master Kumu Facheng (枯木法成), among others, including Yuanwu Keqin, author of the famous kōan collection, the Blue Cliff Record.

In 1129, Hongzhi began teaching at the Jingde monastery on Mount Tiantong, where he remained for nearly thirty years, until shortly before his death in 1157, when he ventured down the mountain to bid farewell to his supporters.

Texts
The main text associated with Hongzhi is a collection of one hundred of his kōans called the Book of Equanimity.  This book was compiled after his death by Wansong Xingxiu (1166–1246) at the urging of the Khitan statesman Yelü Chucai (1190–1244), and first published in 1224, with commentaries by Wansong.  This book is regarded as one of the key texts of the Caodong school of Zen Buddhism.  A collection of Hongzhi's philosophical texts has also been translated by Leighton.

Hongzhi is often referred to as an exponent of Silent Illumination Chan ( in Japanese).

Aside from his own teacher, Eihei Dōgen—the founder of the Sōtō school of Zen in Japan—quotes Hongzhi in his work more than any other Zen figure.

Sources
Cultivating the Empty Field: The Silent Illumination of Zen Master Hongzhi. Edited and translated by Taigen Dan Leighton. Tuttle Library of Enlightenment. Boston; Rutland, Vermont; Tokyo: Tuttle Publishing, 2000 (revised, expanded edition). 
The Book of Equanimity: Illuminating Classic Zen Koans. Translation and commentary by Gerry Shishin Wick. Boston: Wisdom Publication[s], 2005. 
The Book of Serenity. Translated by Thomas Cleary. Hudson, New York: Lindisfarne Press, 1990.

References

External links
 English translation of Shōyōroku

1091 births
1157 deaths
Chinese spiritual writers
Chan Buddhist monks
Chinese Zen Buddhists
Soto Zen Buddhists
Song dynasty Buddhist monks
Song dynasty writers
People from Linfen
Writers from Shanxi
Silence